Black Market is a 1967 Indian Kannada film, directed and produced by S. N. Singh. The film stars Dikki Madhava Rao, Narasimharaju, Sampath and Meese Muniyappa. The film has musical score by Chellapilla Satyam.

Cast

Dikki Madhava Rao
Narasimharaju as Shyamsundar
Sampath as Govind Rao
Meese Muniyappa
Vandana
Sharada
B. Kamalamma
Baby Sujatha
Musuri Krishnamurthy
Chi Sadashivaiah
Sampige Shankar
Ramaraja Urs
Gurumurthy
Guruswamy
Shivaram Nayak
Master Jayaraj Singh

References

External links 
 

1960s Kannada-language films
Films scored by Satyam (composer)